Hagbard and Signe or The Red Mantle is a 1967 internationally co-produced drama film based on the story of Hagbard and Signy from the twelfth-century work Gesta Danorum by Saxo Grammaticus, directed by Gabriel Axel and starring Gitte Hænning. The film won a Technical Prize (Mention spéciale du grand prix technique) at the 1967 Cannes Film Festival.

Cast
Oleg Vidov as Hagbard
Gitte Hænning as Signe
Eva Dahlbeck as The Queen
Birgitte Federspiel as King Hamund's widow
Lisbeth Movin as Bengerd
Johannes Meyer as Bilvis
Håkan Jahnberg as Bolvis
Manfred Reddemann as Hildegisl
Henning Palner as Hake
Gisli Alfredsson as Sigvald
Folmer Rubæk as Helvin
Borgar Garðarsson as Alf (as Borgar Gardarsson)
Jörgen Lantz as King Hammond (as Jørgen Lantz)
Frederik Tharaldsen as Alger
Sisse Reingaard as Rigmor
Gunnar Björnstrand as King Sigvor
Niels Hinrichsen 
Else Højgaard
Jakob Nielsen
Poul Reichhardt

See also
Germanic Heroic Age
Late Antiquity
List of historical period drama films

References

External links
 
 The Red Mantle at the Danish National Filmography

1967 films
1967 drama films
Danish drama films
Swedish drama films
Icelandic drama films
1960s Danish-language films
1960s Swedish-language films
Icelandic-language films
Films directed by Gabriel Axel
ASA Filmudlejning films
Films set in the Viking Age
Works based on Gesta Danorum
Danish multilingual films
Swedish multilingual films
Icelandic multilingual films
1960s Swedish films